Mercedes (IPA: [ˌmɛrˈsɛdɛs];), officially the Municipality of Mercedes,  is a 5th class municipality in the province of Eastern Samar, Philippines. According to the 2020 census, it has a population of 6,112 people.

Act No. 960 of the Philippine Commission incorporated the town of Mercedes comprising the barrios of Busay, Anoron, Sungan, Bobon, Banoyo and Boyayawon into Guiuan. In 1948, Republic Act No. 262 recreated the town.

Geography

Barangays
Mercedes is politically subdivided into 16 barangays.

Climate

Demographics

Economy

References

External links
 Official Mercedes Municipality website
 [ Philippine Standard Geographic Code]
 Philippine Census Information
 Local Governance Performance Management System

Municipalities of Eastern Samar